Duke Gardens may refer to

Duke Gardens (New Jersey)
Sarah P. Duke Gardens